Vidyasagar Rao (born 2 March 1963) is an Indian composer, musician and singer who works predominantly in the Tamil, Malayalam, and Telugu film industries. After working with several composers as assistant and conductor, Vidyasagar made his debut as a film composer in the 1989 Tamil film Poo Manam and nicknamed as Melody King Working for over 225 feature films, he is the recipient of the National Award and five Filmfare Awards.

Life and career
Vidyasagar was born into a Telugu speaking family of Ramachandra Rao, a musician, and Sooryakantham in Amalapuram, Andhra Pradesh. He was named after the 19th century social reformer Ishwar Chandra Vidyasagar. He was brought up in Bobbili. He underwent carnatic vocals training first and then started taking classical guitar classes in Chennai from Master Dhanraj along with A. R. Rahman and then later piano.

Vidyasagar became an independent film composer with the song En Anbe in the 1989 Tamil movie Poomanam. Vidyasagar started his music career with a Tamil film, he gained recognition good in the Tamil music industry at a later stage. He shifted base to Telugu cinema in 1989.

In 1994–95, Vidyasagar was approached by Tamil actor-director Arjun, with whom he worked for many musical films like Jai Hind, Karna and Subash. Their combination resulted in acclaimed Tamil language melodic songs like Malare and Padu Padu.

From 1996 to 2001 Vidyasagar mainly concentrated on Malayalam films. During this period, Vidyasagar also composed for a few Tamil movies like Nilaave Vaa and Uyirodu Uyiraga. He won three Kerala State Film Awards. About his stint in the Malayalam Cinema, Vidyasagar was quoted saying "I believe that it was a God sent opportunity for me to work in one of the finest film industries".

From the year 2002, he started composing soundtracks for Dhil, Run, Dhool, Ghilli etc. in Tamil and Summer in Bethlehem, Meesha Madhavan, Kilichundan Mampazham, Pattalam, C.I.D. Moosa etc. in Malayalam. His Bollywood venture Hulchul directed by Priyadarshan was a box-office blockbuster, but the songs only became nominal hits, not bringing him the acclaim he was usually used to in Tamil and Malayalam films.

During this period, Vidyasagar composed for his first English language feature, Beyond The Soul, a low-budget independent film directed by Rajiv Anchal.

Between 2003 and 2005, he composed songs for several notable films like Anbe Sivam, Madhurey, Kochi Rajavu, Ji and Chandrolsavam in 2004–05. The year 2005 saw Vidyasagar receiving his first National Film Awards for his music in the Telugu film Swarabhishekam directed by K. Vishwanath. The music in the film was predominantly Carnatic. The same year, he composed music for the film Chandramukhi.

In 2007, Vidyasagar was signed by Prakash Raj for his production venture Mozhi starring Prithviraj Sukumaran and Jyothika. The film directed by Radha Mohan had critically acclaimed melodies like Kaatrin Mozhiye and Sevvanam. The songs of Mozhi had the distinction of being completely devoid of duets. The only female voice was of Sujatha Mohan in Katrin Mozhi. In 2008 Vidyasagar's notable releases were Vijay's Kuruvi and the Priyadarshan directed Mere Baap Pehle Aap in Hindi.

After his brief dull phase in Malayalam, he bounced back into the scene with the Lal Jose directorial Neelathamara, scripted by the legendary M.T. Vasudevan Nair, with the song Anuraga Vilochananaayi becoming a cult favourite. He followed it up with hits in Apoorva Ragam and Makeup Man. Meanwhile, in Tamil, he delivered hits with Karthi's Siruthai and Vijay's Kaavalan.

In 2012, Vidyasagar had three releases in Malayalam with Diamond Necklace, Thappana and Ordinary.

In 2013, Priyadarshan signed him in for his film, Geethaanjali in Malayalam with Mohanlal in the lead role. Lal Jose's Pullipulikalum Aattinkuttiyum and Jannal Oram, the Tamil remake of Ordinary were his other releases of the year. The end of veteran filmmaker Sathyan Anthikkad's 10-film long collaboration with composer Ilaiyaraaja saw him collaborate with Vidyasagar for the film Oru Indian Pranayakatha. Sathyan Anthikad continued his collaboration with Vidyasagar for his next 2 films, Ennum Eppozhum (released in 2015) and Jomonte Suvisheshangal (released in 2017).

Discography

Awards

Interview
 Vidyasagar Interview (BehindwoodsTV, January 2020)
 Vidyasagar talks on music (International Broadcasting Corporation for Tamil, February 2020)

See also
 List of films directed by Lal Jose featuring Vidyasagar
 Varsha Vallaki Studios

References

External links

 
 [ Vidyasagar] at AllMusic
 Vidyasagar Facebook
 

 
1963 births
Living people
Telugu people
Indian male composers
Tamil Nadu State Film Awards winners
Tamil film score composers
Telugu film score composers
Malayalam film score composers
Filmfare Awards South winners
Kerala State Film Award winners
Best Music Direction National Film Award winners
20th-century Indian composers
Film musicians from Andhra Pradesh
People from Vizianagaram
Recipients of the Kalaimamani Award
Male film score composers